Axtell Julius Byles (October 1, 1880 – September 28, 1941) was an American football player and coach. He served as the co-head football coach at Washington and Lee University in Lexington, Virginia with D. M. Balliet in 1903,  compiling a record of 4–1. Byles died in 1941.

Head coaching record

References

External links
 

1880 births
1941 deaths
Princeton Tigers football players
Washington and Lee Generals football coaches
People from Titusville, Pennsylvania
Players of American football from Pennsylvania